The Coiban agouti (Dasyprocta coibae) is a species of rodent in the family Dasyproctidae. It is endemic to the island of Coiba (Panama) and resembles the more widespread Central American agouti. It is threatened by habitat loss.

References

Dasyprocta
Rodents of Central America
Mammals described in 1902
Taxa named by Oldfield Thomas
Taxonomy articles created by Polbot